Debra Philece Sampler (July 16, 1953 – July 1, 2021) was an American film, television and voice actress. She got her start on the soap operas Days of Our Lives as Renée DuMonde and Another World as Donna Love Hudson.

In addition to her acting career, Sampler provided the voice to various characters in animated series, such as Toph Beifong in The Legend of Korra. She also voiced characters in English-language dubs, such as Mimi Tachikawa and Cody Hida from Digimon: Digital Monsters, Tiptory in Eureka Seven, and Hiyori Tamura from Lucky Star.

Life and career
Sampler was born in San Angelo, Texas, on July 16, 1953. She graduated from J.J. Pearce High School in Richardson, Texas in 1971. After graduating from the University of North Texas in 1975 with a drama degree, Sampler moved to Hollywood and quickly landed guest roles in a few television movies and series, including The Incredible Hulk in season 4, episode 59 titled "Dark Side".

Sampler first made a name for herself playing Renée DuMonde on the soap Days of Our Lives. The Renee character became the focus of a major 1983 murder mystery, resulting in one of the most spectacular send-offs in daytime history. After leaving Days of our Lives in September 1983, she went on to the TV series Rituals, which ran from 1984–1985. The show also starred future soap stars Mary Beth Evans (Kayla, Days) and Jon Lindstrom (Kevin, GH), as well as veteran soap star Kin Shriner (ex-Scotty, GH; ex-Brian, B&B) and Tina Louise (Ginger from Gilligan's Island). After Rituals, Philece went on to Another World in 1986 to play Donna Love, a role she took over from originating actress Anna Stuart. She left AW in 1989 when Stuart reclaimed the role. She had a couple of guest-starring roles on TJ Hooker as Sue Ann and on Hunter as Casey. She then took a  sabbatical to Japan with her then-fiance. She returned to the US with a few screenplays and formed Philman Entertainment, a production company.

Sampler worked as associate producer of the Los Angeles stage hit Sordid Lives by Del Shores. She performed in UPN's animated series The Incredible Hulk, as the voice of Betty Ross. She remained pals with her former Days of Our Lives love-interest Gregg Marx (David Banning). She performed a voice-over on Real Monsters – "Ollie Ollie Oxen Free". She did a voice on Nickelodeon's Rugrats, where she played Emma (Chuckie's love interest) in the episode "He Saw, She Saw".

Death
Sampler died from a heart attack in Los Angeles on July 1, 2021, at the age of 67, 15 days shy of her 68th birthday.

Filmography

Live-action roles

Anime

 Bleach - Ayame, Chizuru Honsho, Waineton (Cain's Doll)
 Idol Project - Layla B. Simmons
 Kill la Kill - Mataro Mankanshoku (credited as Lindsey Eaton)
 Kyo Kara Maoh - Nicola
 Last Exile - Alister Agrew, Claus Valca (Young)
 Love Hina - Tsuruko Aoyama
 Lucky Star - Hiyori Tamura
 Marmalade Boy - Asst. Principal Kyoto
 Mars Daybreak - Anya
 Mobile Suit Gundam F91 - Manuela Panopa
 Mobile Suit Gundam: Iron-Blooded Orphans - Sakura Pretzel
 Mouse - Mei's Grandmother, Samasa Morijima
 Overman King Gainer - Elizabeth
 Please Twins - Futaba Mashita
 Rozen Maiden - Mitsu 'Micchan' Kusakabe
 Samurai Champloo - Budokiba
 Samurai Girl Real Bout High School - Madoka Mitsurugi
 SD Gundam Force - Mayor Margaret Gathermoon, Noah
 The Incredible Hulk - Betty Ross (1997)
 The Seven Deadly Sins - Mead
 The Twelve Kingdoms - Gobo
 Tokko - Sakura Rokujo
 Transformers: Robots in Disguise - Kelly
 Tweeny Witches: The Adventures - Iga (Ep. 5)
 Ultra Maniac - Maya Orihara
 Vandread - Barnette Orangello
 Viewtiful Joe - Silvia
 Wild Arms: Twilight Venom - Jerusha

Animation

Film

Video games
 AI: The Somnium Files - Mayumi Matsushita
 Arcanum: Of Steamworks and Magick Obscura - Z'an Al'urin
 BlazBlue series - Taokaka
 Blue Dragon - Child, Female Village, Devour Village Old Woman
 Deadly Premonition 2: A Blessing in Disguise - Mrs. Carpenter
 Demon Slayer: Kimetsu no Yaiba – The Hinokami Chronicles - Rokuta Kamado
Legends of Runeterra - Fizz, Kennen
Rune Factory 5 - Yuki
 Shenmue III - Additional Cast

Documentary
 Adventures in Voice Acting - Herself

References
Credit List anime

 Episode 19:  

Other references

External links

 

1953 births
2021 deaths
20th-century American actresses
21st-century American actresses
American film actresses
American soap opera actresses
American television actresses
American video game actresses
American voice actresses
University of North Texas alumni